R&F Yingkai Square is a late-modernist skyscraper in Guangzhou, China completed in 2014. The cutouts in its design are said to imitate the structure of bamboo.

It houses the 208-unit Park Hyatt Guangzhou hotel, as well as 114,500 m2 of office space and a further 10,000 m2 of retail space.

See also
List of tallest buildings in Guangzhou
List of tallest buildings in China

References

Office buildings completed in 2014
Skyscrapers in Guangzhou
Buildings and structures in Guangzhou